Petr Korda defeated Fabrice Santoro 6–0, 6–3 to win the 1998 Qatar ExxonMobil Open singles competition. Jim Courier was the defending champion but did not defend his title.

Seeds
Champion seeds are indicated in bold text while text in italics indicates the round in which those seeds were eliminated.

Draw

Finals

Section 1

Section 2

References

External links
 1998 Qatar Open draw

1998 Qatar Open
1998 ATP Tour